Xerochlamys coriacea is a tree in the family Sarcolaenaceae. It is endemic to Madagascar.

Description
The tree's flowers are solitary or in inflorescences of two or three flowers, with white petals.

Distribution and habitat
Xerochlamys coriacea is only found in the central southern regions of Haute Matsiatra, Androy and Anosy. The conservation status of the species is vulnerable.

References

coriacea
Endemic flora of Madagascar
Trees of Madagascar
Plants described in 2009